Trifolium cherleri, the cupped clover, is a species of flowering plant in the family Fabaceae. It is native to the Canary Islands, the Mediterranean, and the Middle East as far east as Iran, and it has been introduced to Australia as a forage. Three cultivars have been developed in Australia; 'Beenong', 'Yamina' and 'Lisare'.

References

cherleri
Forages
Flora of the Canary Islands
Flora of North Africa
Flora of Southwestern Europe
Flora of Southeastern Europe
Flora of Western Asia
Plants described in 1753
Taxa named by Carl Linnaeus